John MacLoughlin (8 September 1871 – 11 September 1943) was an Irish politician. He was a  member of the Free State Seanad Éireann from 1922 to 1936. He was first elected at the 1922 Seanad election as an independent candidate. He joined Cumann na nGaedheal in 1931. He was elected to the 2nd Seanad in 1938 on the Industrial and Commercial Panel as a Fine Gael member. He was re-elected to the 3rd Seanad and served until he lost his seat at the 1943 Seanad election.

References

1871 births
1943 deaths
Cumann na nGaedheal senators
Fine Gael senators
Independent members of Seanad Éireann
Members of the 1922 Seanad
Members of the 1925 Seanad
Members of the 1928 Seanad
Members of the 1931 Seanad
Members of the 1934 Seanad
Members of the 2nd Seanad
Members of the 3rd Seanad